The Zeiraphera griseana, the larch tortrix, is a moth of the family Tortricidae.

Description
The wingspan is 16–22 mm. The long, narrow forewings are greyish brown, lightly speckled with whitish. The brown-gray hindwings are broader than the forewings.

Biology
Zeiraphera griseana is a single-brooded species. Adults are on wing in July depending on the location. Larvae live inside a tube-like spinning among the leaves. They feed on the needles of Larix species (Larix gmelini and Larix decidua), Picea asperata, Abies fabri, Pinus sylvestris and Pinus cembra.

Distribution
This species is present in Europe, China (Hebei, Inner Mongolia, Jilin, Shaanxi, Gansu, Xinjiang), Korea, Japan, Russia and North America.

Bibliography
Friedrich-Karl Holtmeier: Tier in der Landschaft - Einfluss und ökologische Bedeutung. Ulmer Verlag, Stuttgart 2002,

References

External links

Swedish Moths
 Bug Guide

Moths described in 1799
Eucosmini
Moths of Japan
Moths of Europe
Insects of Iceland